Palmera is a 2013 Argentine independent film directed by Leo Damario and starring Micaela Breque, Ceci Barros, Macarena Del Corro, Alina Jaume, Geraldine Guillermo and Érica García. The plot revolves around a group of six girlfriends who go to a large house in Tigre experimenting with psychoactive drugs, until one of them has a stroke.

The film premiered as the opening film of Proyecciones fuera de la común: Cine + música al aire libre, an event held in Ciudad Cultural Konex, Buenos Aires, Argentina. It is also available in Muvi, a social movie platform.

The film features Micaela Breque nude, which drew comparisons between her and the iconic Isabel Sarli.

References

External links
 

2013 films
2010s Spanish-language films
Argentine independent films
2010s Argentine films